Kyzyl-Kuch (Qıźıl Kös) is a rural locality (a village) in Kadyrovsky Selsoviet, Ilishevsky District, Bashkortostan, Russia. The population was 5 as of 2010. There is 1 streets.

Geography 
Kyzyl-Kuch is located 24 km southwest of Verkhneyarkeyevo (the district's administrative centre) by road. Kadyrovo is the nearest rural locality.

References 

Rural localities in Ilishevsky District